Calais is a city in France. The name can also refer to:

Places
 Calais, Maine, United States, a city
 Calais, Vermont, United States, a town
 Arrondissement of Calais, France
 Calais (constituency), the electoral area of Calais, France, represented in the Parliament of England before the French reconquest in the 16th century
 Calais, Alberta, Canada, an unincorporated community
 Calais, Limpopo, South Africa, a village
 Mount Calais, Alexander Island, Antarctica
 A crater on Saturn's moon Phoebe (moon)

Automobiles
 Cadillac Calais
 Oldsmobile Cutlass Calais
 Holden Calais

Given name
 Calaïs , one of the Boreads in Greek mythology
 Saint Calais, French hermit-saint, namesake of commune of Saint-Calais
 Calais Campbell (born 1986), American National Football League player

Other uses
 Calais (beetle), a genus of click beetles
 Calais (Reuters product), an internet toolkit
 Calais RUFC, a former French football club
 Calais Railroad, Maine